Lioptilodes cocodrilo is a species of moth in the genus Lioptilodes known from Ecuador. Moths of this species take flight in September, October, December, and January, and have a wingspan of approximately 16 millimetres. The specific name "cocodrilo" references Cocodrilo Ranger Station.

References

Platyptiliini
Moths described in 2006
Taxa named by Cees Gielis